Love It When I Feel Like This is the debut album by Birmingham based indie band The Twang, which was released in the United Kingdom on 4 June 2007 through B-Unique Records. The album was produced by the band's long term collaborator Gavin Monaghan at The Magic Garden Studio, Wolverhampton, and was assisted by Gazz Rogers. It contains the band's first two singles, "Wide Awake" and "Either Way", plus nine brand new tracks.

In a January 2008 interview on Planet Sound, Phil Etheridge said that the record label were expecting the album to sell more, due to the hype the band received before album release. However, Etheridge in the same interview, expressed his pride in "having a gold disc on my wall".

Nearly two years after its initial release, the album was released in the U.S. on 14 April 2009 via Arena Rock Records

Track listing
All tracks written by Phil Etheridge & Jon Watkin except track 5 written by Phil Etheridge, Jon Watkin, Hurby Azor & Ray Davies
 "Ice Cream Sundae" – 3:46
 "Wide Awake" – 4:48
 "The Neighbour" – 3:14
 "Either Way" – 4:02
 "Push the Ghosts" – 4:11
 "Reap What You Sow" – 4:19
 "Loosely Dancing" – 3:12
 "Two Lovers" – 3:28
 "Don't Wait Up" – 3:16
 "Got Me Sussed" – 3:54
 "Cloudy Room" – 5:05

Singles

External links
Official Website
Official Myspace
"Love It When I Feel Like This" e-card

2007 debut albums
The Twang albums